Below is a list of squads used in the 2011 African Nations Championship.

Group A

Sudan
Coach: Mazda

Source: Sudan Team

Gabon
Coach:  Pierre Aubameyang

Source: Gabon Team

Uganda
Coach:  Bobby Williamson

Source: Uganda Team

Algeria
Coach: Abdelhak Benchikha

 

Source: Algeria Team

Group B

Ghana
Coach: Herbert Addo

Source: Ghana Team

South Africa
Coach: Simon Ngomane

South Africa chose a "Developmental" squad which mostly consisted of players from the third tier in South African football.

Source: South Africa Team

Zimbabwe
Coach: Madinda Ndlovu

Sources: Zimbabwe Team   Communiqué match No.12: Ghana-Zimbabwe

Niger
Coach: Harouna Doula Gabde

Source: Niger Team

Group C

Congo DR
Coach: Jean-Santos Muntubila

Source: Congo DR Team

Cameroon
Coach: Emmanuel N'Doumbé Bosso

Source: Cameroon Team

Ivory Coast
Coach: Georges Kouadio

Source: Côte d'Ivoire Team

Mali
Coach: Amadou Pathé Diallo

Source: Mali Team

Group D

Senegal
Coach: Joseph Koto

Source: Senegal Team

Rwanda
Coach:  Sellas Tetteh

Source: Communiqué match No.7: Senegal-Rwanda

Angola
Coach: Lito Vidigal

Source: Angola Team

Tunisia
Coach: Sami Trabelsi

Source: Tunisia Team

References

External links
Team Lists at CAFOnline.com
CHAN Orange 2011 at Starafrica.com

Squads
African Nations Championship squads